Anne Douglas-Hamilton, 2nd Countess of Orkney (1696 – 6 December 1756) was a Scottish noblewoman and the eldest daughter of Field Marshal George Hamilton, 1st Earl of Orkney, and his wife, the former Elizabeth Villiers.

She was also known as Anne O'Brien, Countess of Inchiquin, through her marriage to her first cousin William O'Brien, 4th Earl of Inchiquin, the O'Brien, Chief of the Name, Prince of Thomond, and Lord of Dál gCais. They were married on 29 March 1720. Their daughter, Lady Mary (c. 1721–1790), succeeded her mother in the earldom of Orkney.

Their other children were:
William, Lord O'Brien (1725–1727)
George, Lord O'Brien (born 1728; died in infancy)
Augustus (died in infancy)
Murrough, Viscount Kirkwall (died 1741, in childhood), who was heir to Henry O'Brien, 8th Earl of Thomond, but died before inheriting
Anne (c.1721-1808)
Frances (died 1740)
Elizabeth (died 1741)

References

1756 deaths
People associated with Orkney
Hereditary women peers
202
Scottish countesses
Inchiquin
Anne, Countess of Orkney
People from County Clare
18th-century Irish people
1696 births
18th-century Scottish people
18th-century Scottish women
18th-century Irish women